Fluviopupa ramsayi is a species of very small freshwater snails that have an operculum, aquatic gastropod Molluscs in the family Hydrobiidae. This species is endemic to Australia.

References

ramsayi
Gastropods of Australia
Gastropods described in 1889
Taxonomy articles created by Polbot